Barbara Cox may refer to:

Barbara Cox (writer), British television writer and script editor
Barbara Cox (footballer) (born 1947), New Zealand international women's football (soccer) player
Barbara Cox Anthony (1922–2007), media owner, daughter of James M. Cox